Riccardin C is a macrocyclic bis(bibenzyl). It is a secondary metabolite isolated from the Siberian cowslip subspecies Primula veris subsp. macrocalyx, in Reboulia hemisphaerica and in the Chinese liverwort Plagiochasma intermedium.

In 2005, the compound was prepared by total synthesis together with the strained compound cavicularin.

References 

Dihydrostilbenoids
Macrocycles
Cyclophanes
Heterocyclic compounds with 5 rings
Oxygen heterocycles